Evan Township is a township in Kingman County, Kansas, USA.  As of the 2000 census, its population was 516.

Geography
Evan Township covers an area of 36.33 square miles (94.08 square kilometers); of this, 1.27 square miles (3.29 square kilometers) or 3.5 percent is water.

Unincorporated towns
 Mount Vernon
(This list is based on USGS data and may include former settlements.)

Adjacent townships
 Ninnescah Township, Reno County (north)
 Sumner Township, Reno County (northeast)
 Grand River Township, Sedgwick County (east)
 Morton Township, Sedgwick County (southeast)
 Vinita Township (south)
 Dale Township (southwest)
 Galesburg Township (west)
 Albion Township, Reno County (northwest)

Cemeteries
The township contains one cemetery, Mount Vernon.

Major highways
 U.S. Route 54

References
 U.S. Board on Geographic Names (GNIS)
 United States Census Bureau cartographic boundary files

External links
 City-Data.com

Townships in Kingman County, Kansas
Townships in Kansas